Sporopipes is a genus of bird in the weaver family. 
It contains the following species:

External links

References

 
Ploceidae
Bird genera
Taxonomy articles created by Polbot